Archimantis is a genus of praying mantis found in Australia. These species are ranging from 150 mm to 180mm, and can be quite aggressive when full adult.

Species
The Mantodea Species File lists:
Archimantis armata Wood-Mason, 1877
Archimantis brunneriana Saussure, 1871
Archimantis gracilis Milledge, 1997
Archimantis latistyla (Serville, 1839)
Archimantis monstrosa Wood-Mason, 1878
Archimantis quinquelobata Tepper, 1905
Archimantis sobrina Saussure, 1872 - synonym Archimantis minor Giglio-Tos, 1917
Archimantis straminea Sjostedt, 1918
Archimantis vittata Milledge, 1997

See also 
Stick Mantis
Burying mantis

References

 
Insects of Australia
Mantodea genera
Hierodulinae